The Teaching Awards is an annual teacher awards ceremony in the United Kingdom.

In 2008, the awards were hosted by Jeremy Vine and Myleene Klass. In 2009, the awards were hosted by Jeremy Vine and Christine Lampard. In 2010, Lenny Henry presented the awards. Recently, Dan Snow, Historian has presented the show, which is televised on BBC Two.

Presenters
Jeremy Vine (2007–2009)
Kate Thornton (2007)
Elisabeth Sladen (2007)
Myleene Klass (2008)
Christine Lampard (2009)
Lenny Henry (2010–2011)
Clare Balding (2012–2013)
Dan Snow (2014–2015)
Hugh Dennis (2016)
Naga Munchetty (2017)
Sean Fletcher (2017–)
Anita Rani (2018)

Process 
Every year, all schools and FE colleges are invited to nominate their most outstanding headteachers, teachers, teaching assistants, lecturers and school teams. Anyone can make a nomination. Nominations are then endorsed by the senior management team to proceed to the next stage. The Awards year culminates in a televised UK Ceremony,  held in the Autumn, where awards are given out in various categories.
The show, Britain's Classroom Heroes, is broadcast on BBC2.

The Teaching Awards Trust 
The Teaching Awards were established by Lord Puttnam CBE in 1998 and are managed by an independent charity, the Teaching Awards Trust. The Teaching Awards Trust aims to celebrate excellence and promote best practice in education. The Oscar award winning actress Emma Thompson became the president of the Teaching Awards in 2009. She said "I owe so much of what I've done to my fantastic teachers at school and at university and it's exciting to join in celebrating what is probably the most important profession of them all".

Goals 
The Teaching Awards Trust was initially established to regenerate national pride in the teaching profession. The Trust has been successful in achieving this aim and has repositioned itself as a centre of excellence in education with the following aims:
 promote teaching as a career
 disseminate best practice
 encourage the involvement of other stakeholders in education
 engage with a wider audience at a national level

Profile 
The Awards are supported by all the main political parties, the Department for Education in England, the Department of Education in Northern Ireland, the Scottish Executive and the Welsh Assembly Government as well as all the national teaching unions and associations.

The Teaching Awards Trust works in partnership with the BBC. The UK Ceremony is a produced in conjunction with the BBC and is shown on BBC Two in a primetime slot as a showcase of excellence in education. During the programme, winning teachers are presented with a Plato award, designed by sculptor Glynis Owen and based on her work titled 'The Thinking Man.' Examples can be seen at http://www.glynisowensculptor.co.uk.

Funding 
The Teaching Awards are funded through sponsorship, donations and grants. The current main sponsor is Pearson plc.

External links
Teaching Awards Official site

Educational awards in the United Kingdom
1998 establishments in the United Kingdom
Awards established in 1998
Teaching in the United Kingdom
Annual events in the United Kingdom